Phra Tamnak Hill or Khao Phra Tamnak ( 'palace hill') is located between Pattaya Beach and Jomtien Beach on the south side of Pattaya and is known for its viewpoints Chaloem Phrakiat Park and the temple Wat Phra Yai, also known as Big Buddha Hill, which is generally known for its large golden Buddha statue.

Location 
The location borders numerous beaches, Bali Hai Beach (north), Pattaya Beach (north-northeast), Royal Cliff Beach, Cozy Beach and Pratumnak Beach (west), Sugar Beach (southwest), Dongtan Beach and the Jomtien Beach (South-Southeast) to the Gulf of Thailand.

Facilities 

Phra Tamnak Hill or Pratumnak Hill is a spot for fitness and beach leisure. Under the patronage of His Royal Majesty Bhumibol Adulyadej, it has an impact on the development and rise of sailing, yacht racing, and sea sports. At the peak of Phra Tamnak Hill is the Buddhist temple Wat Phra Yai. It is surrounded by other attractions and memorials such as Abhakara Kiartivongse monument, Pattaya and the Taoist temple Wang Sam Sien. Pattaya Park and Pattaya Tower are on the south end of Phra Tamnak Hill and the Pattaya Exhibition and Convention Hall (P.E.A.C.H.) is on the north. From there down the hill is the Bali Hai Pier and the Walking Street, Pattaya.

References

External links 
Life on Pratumnak Hill, 2018 (General information on Phra Tamnak Hill)

Neighbourhoods of Pattaya
Hills of Thailand